The Communist Party of Nepal (Marxist) was a political party in Nepal. It was formed through the merger of the Communist Party of Nepal (Manmohan) led by Man Mohan Adhikari and the Communist Party of Nepal (Pushpa Lal) led by Sahana Pradhan in 1987. The Nepal Trade Union Centre was the trade union of CPN (Marxist) and Nepal Progressive Students Union was their students' union.

History 
The CPN (Marxist) was closely connected to the Communist Party of India (Marxist). The CPN (Marxist) was a member of the United Left Front and took part in the 1990 Nepalese revolution (Jana Andholan) against the Rana regime in 1990. The party merged with another constituent of the United Left Front, the Communist Party of Nepal (Marxist–Leninist) to form the Communist Party of Nepal (Unified Marxist–Leninist). A sizeable section of the old CPN (Marxist) leadership did however broke away from the CPN (UML) and reconstituted their own Communist Party of Nepal (Marxist).

See also
 List of communist parties in Nepal

References

See also
 History of Nepal
 Politics of Nepal
 List of political parties in Nepal

Defunct communist parties in Nepal
Political parties established in 1986
1986 establishments in Nepal
Political parties disestablished in 1991
1991 disestablishments in Nepal